Ronaldo Nogueira de Oliveira (born 25 April 1966 in Carazinho) is a Brazilian administrator, pastor of Assembly of God Church and politician, affiliated to the Brazilian Labor Party. Currently, is discharged federal deputy and minister of Labour and Social Security of Brazil since 12 May 2016, appointed by president Michel Temer.

Slave Labor
In October 2017, a resolution presented by Ronaldo Nogueira and adopted by the government, altered the terms by which people who are exploited under conditions analogous to slavery could benefit from legal proceedings.

One of the measures outlined in the decree redefines slavery as being confined to "restrictions on the freedom of movement" of workers. However, experts note that such a reformulation pushes the country back to May 13, 1888, when the legalities of slavery were abolished in Brazil.

Political career
Nogueira voted in favor of the impeachment against then-president Dilma Rousseff. Nogueira voted in favor of the Brazil labor reform (2017), and would later back Rousseff's successor Michel Temer against a similar corruption investigation and impeachment motion.

References

|-

1966 births
Living people
Brazilian Labour Party (current) politicians
Brazilian Assemblies of God pastors
Government ministers of Brazil
Members of the Chamber of Deputies (Brazil) from Rio Grande do Sul